The Garry River is a river in the Canterbury region of New Zealand. It arises in the Mount Thomas Forest near Mount Thomas and flows south-east into Ashley River / Rakahuri. Blowhard Stream is a tributary.

See also
List of rivers of New Zealand

References

Land Information New Zealand - Search for Place Names

Rivers of Canterbury, New Zealand
Rivers of New Zealand